Sicana odorifera is a large, herbaceous perennial vine native to tropical South America, grown as an ornamental plant and for its sweet edible fruit.  English names include cassabanana or casbanan, sikana, puttigel and musk cucumber.

The fast-growing, fleshy vine can reach 15 m or more in height, climbing with four-part adhesive tendrils.  The large, hairy, palmately lobed leaves grow to 30 cm in width.

The fruit is large, up to 60 cm long, with skin of variable color. The fruit has a delicious, melon-like taste when it is ripe, which needs high temperatures to ripen. The sweet, aromatic, yellow-to-orange flesh of the mature fruit is eaten raw or made into preserves.  The immature fruit can be cooked as a vegetable.

Cultivation 
It is propagated by seeds. It is grown widely in the warm parts of Latin America, as well as by the Cajun people of the southern United States. It needs good drainage to grow well, and does well on an acidic mix of sand (or perlite) and rich compost.

References

External links 
 Information from Fruits of Warm Climates

Cucurbitoideae
Flora of South America